Harold Edward Joseph "Bullet Joe" Simpson (August 13, 1893 – December 26, 1973) was a Canadian professional ice hockey defenceman who played for the Edmonton Eskimos and New York Americans between 1920 and 1931. He later served as coach of the Americans between 1932 and 1935. Simpson was inducted into the Hockey Hall of Fame.

Biography
Simpson was born in Selkirk, Manitoba. Nicknamed "Bullet" because of very fast skating ability, he started his career in the Canadian west. He learned the sport of ice hockey on a frozen slough, near his house, during the early 1900s. As Simpson once stated, Manitoba Avenue ran east and west in the middle of Selkirk. The boys living in the north end were the northern team and those south of Manitoba Avenue made up the southern team. After graduating from the Selkirk Fishermen Juniors, Simpson played senior ice hockey with the Winnipeg Victorias of the NHA in 1914–15.

On August 26, 1915 Simpson enlisted in the Canadian military, joining the 31st Battalion. Remaining in Canada, he transferred to the 61st Battalion and played the 1915–16 season with their hockey team, helping them win the 1916 Allan Cup, the amateur championship of Canada. Two weeks after winning the Cup Simpson was sent overseas, and arrived in the United Kingdom in early April 1916. He was hospitalized in August 1916 with gonorrhea, but was sent to the Western Front in time to take part in the Battle of Somme, where he was wounded in the left leg and back, being hospitalized again. In July 1917 Simpson was promoted to lieutenant, and in August 1917 was awarded the Military Medal. He was dismissed from the service on February 28, 1918 by finding of the General Court Martial, but no further details exist in his record, and five days later he was back in his position. He was wounded again in August 1918, in the right shoulder, and once again was sent back for hospitalization. He was discharged in early November 1918, just before the Armistice.

Back in Manitoba by early 1919, Simpson played the last four games of the ice hockey season for his hometown Selkirk Fisherman Seniors of the Manitoba Seniors League. He started again for the Seniors the following year. Simpson joined the Eskimos in 1920, signing as a free agent on November 4.

In 1921–22, he won a Western Hockey League first team all-star berth. He was named to the first team on three occasions and to the second team once. At that time, Newsy Lalonde called Simpson the greatest living hockey player. His end-to-end rushes were legendary and without comparison.

When the Western Hockey League ceased operations at the end of the 1924–25 season, Simpson's contract was purchased by the New York Americans of the National Hockey League. Simpson, John Morrison and Roy Rickey were traded September 18, 1925 for $10,000. Simpson played six seasons with the Amerks and in 1931 took on the role of team coach for three years. He later managed the New Haven and Minneapolis teams.

Simpson moved to Florida in 1938 to promote ice hockey, becoming the head coach of the Miami Clippers of the short-lived Tropical Hockey League. He later suffered a heart attack that kept him inactive for two years.  Another retired ice hockey player and Floridian came to his aid. Art Coulter hired him to work at the Coulter White's hardware store in Coral Gables, Florida, a position he held until 1965.

Simpson was inducted into the Hockey Hall of Fame in 1963. He died December 25, 1973, in Coral Gables at the age of 80. In 1975, he was inducted into Canada's Sports Hall of Fame. Simpson was also inducted into the Manitoba Sports Hall of Fame in 2013.

In 1994, the Marine Museum of Manitoba in Selkirk restored a 1963 flat-bottomed freighter which is now on display and renamed the Harold Bullet Joe Simpson.

Career statistics

Regular season and playoffs

Head coaching record

Awards and achievements
 Allan Cup championship (1916)
 WCHL First All-Star Team (1922)
 Inducted into the Hockey Hall of Fame in 1963
 Honoured Member of the Manitoba Hockey Hall of Fame

References

Bibliography

External links
 
 Joe Simpson biography at Canada's Sports Hall of Fame
 Joe Simpson biography at the Manitoba Hockey Hall of Fame
 Joe Simpson's War Records at Library and Archives Canada: Soldiers of the First World War

1893 births
1973 deaths
Canadian ice hockey coaches
Canadian ice hockey defencemen
Canadian military personnel of World War I
Edmonton Eskimos (ice hockey) players
Hockey Hall of Fame inductees
Ice hockey people from Manitoba
Manitoba Sports Hall of Fame inductees 
New York Americans coaches
New York Americans players
Sportspeople from Selkirk, Manitoba
Winnipeg Victorias players
Canadian recipients of the Military Medal
Canadian expatriate ice hockey players in the United States